This is a list of seasons completed by the Philadelphia Soul. The Soul are a professional arena football franchise of the Arena Football League (AFL), based in Philadelphia, Pennsylvania. The team was established in 2004. The Soul have appeared in four ArenaBowls, the first coming in the 2008 season, where they finished with the best record in the league, and put together a playoff run that ended with a win in ArenaBowl XXII. The team made back to back appearances in ArenaBowl XXV and ArenaBowl XXVI, however lost both games. The Soul won their fourth appearance in ArenaBowl XXIX. Prior to the 2009 season, the AFL announced that it had suspended operations indefinitely and canceled the 2009 season. The league returned in 2010, however the Soul did not return until . The team plays all of its home games at Wells Fargo Center. Until its closing in 2009, the team played Saturday home games at Wachovia Spectrum.

References
General
 

Specific

Arena Football League seasons by team
 
Philadelphia-related lists
Pennsylvania sports-related lists